Cypress Creek is a stream that flows from Snake Creek and Mound Creek in Waller County, Texas to its mouth at Spring Creek in Harris County, Texas. It is part of the Cypress Creek watershed, and flows into the west fork of the San Jacinto River watershed- eventually flowing to the Gulf of Mexico.

The banks of this creek were a settling location for German immigrants in the 1840s. The settlement was later named the city of Cypress, Texas.

See also
List of rivers of Texas

References

USGS Hydrologic Unit Map - State of Texas (1974)

Rivers of Texas
Rivers of Waller County, Texas
Rivers of Harris County, Texas